Part of a series of articles upon Archaeology of Kosovo

Recorded traces of the Vërban archaeological site, inform us a lot about site selection for the settlement building during the Roman times. The site is set close to Klokot, in an alluvial terrace stretched along the Morava river flow, an area known for the fertile land and near the warm thermal mineral waters spring. One of the most interesting accidental archaeological discoveries is a sculpture found near the Banja e Kllokotit, a masterpiece of the Dardanian art, presenting an example of the distinguished autochthonous sculpturing art, of advanced artistic creation. It is sculptured in qualitative marble, and reflects a figure of a high-toned Dardanian lady.

See also 
Roman Dardania
Roman cities in Illyria
Archaeology of Kosovo
Roman Period Sites in Kosovo
Neolithic Sites in Kosovo
Copper, Bronze and Iron Age Sites in Kosovo
Late Antiquity and Medieval Sites in Kosovo

References 

Illyrian Kosovo
Archaeology of Illyria
Moesia
Archaeological sites in Kosovo
Dardanians
Dardania (Roman province)
Roman towns and cities in Kosovo